Hookeria is a genus of mainly tropical mosses. It was defined by James Edward Smith in 1808 and named for William Jackson Hooker

References

External links 

Hookeriales
Moss genera
Taxa named by James Edward Smith